Khan Saadat (also Romanized as Khān Sa‘ādat) is a village in Miyan Velayat Rural District, in the Central District of Mashhad County, Razavi Khorasan Province, Iran. At the 2006 census, its population was 346, in 82 families.

References 

Populated places in Mashhad County